{{Infobox television
| image                = Yeh Rishta Kya Kehlata Hai title screen.jpg
| image_upright        = 
| image_size           = 
| image_alt            = 
| caption              =
| genre              = Soap opera
| company            = Director's Kut Productions
| developer          = 
| writer             = 
| director           = 
| creative_director  = Vivek Bahl
| starring           = 
| opentheme          = Yeh Rishta Kya Kehlata Hai by Alka Yagnik
| country            = India
| language           = Hindi
| num_episodes       = 4,007 
| music              = Navin TripatiManish Tripathi
| executive_producer = Vivek Jain
| producer           = Rajan Shahi
| cinematography     = Arjuni Rao
| editor             = Sameer Gandhi
| camera             = Multi-camera
| runtime            = 20–22 minutes
| network            = StarPlus
| picture_format     = 
| audio_format       = 
| first_aired        = 
| last_aired         = present
| list_episodes      = 
| related            = 

Yeh Rishta Kya Kehlata Hai, popularly known as YRKKH is an Indian Hindi-language romantic family drama television series that airs on StarPlus and streams on Disney+ Hotstar. It premiered on 12 January 2009 and is the longest running Indian television soap opera. Produced by Rajan Shahi under the banner of Director's Kut Productions, it formerly starred Hina Khan, Karan Mehra, Shivangi Joshi and Mohsin Khan. Since October 2021, it stars Pranali Rathod and Harshad Chopda.

Plot
Akshara and Naitik, both from large Marwari joint families based in Udaipur get married. Initially, they struggle to understand each other but gradually come to understand, support, and love each other. Soon, their son, Naksh is born. Naitik falls into a coma due to an accident.

4 years later
Akshara starts working in the family business. Naitik recovers from the coma and struggles to bond with a mischievous Naksh. Naitik's mother Gayatri dies after falling off a cliff post, and his sister Rashmi gives birth to a daughter and names her Gayatri. Akshara and Naitik's daughter Naira is born. Mahendra dies and Kaveri blames Akshara for it and disowns her. Akshara and Naitik move out with their children.

10 years later
They relocate to Cape Town. Naksh returns to Udaipur and convinces Kaveri to forgive an innocent Akshara. Eventually, the family is reunited. Naksh falls for Tara, a hockey player. However, their wedding gets called off due to some misunderstandings. Out of fear of being wrongly blamed for her friend Sukanya's death, Naira flees from Udaipur.

7 years later
Naira lives in an orphanage in Rishikesh and has grown up to be headstrong but insecure and arrogant. Akshara reaches there to fund the orphanage and finds Naira. Kartik Goenka arrives in Udaipur and a love triangle is formed between him, Gayatri, and Naira. Kartik realizes his love for Naira while Gayatri has feelings for Kartik. Naira finally accepts Akshara.

Kartik confesses his love for Naira while the latter is initially confused about her feelings but later realizes her love for Kartik. Akshara dies by falling off a cliff in a car crash.

Kartik and Naira get married. Kartik hates his father Manish and his step-mother Swarna as he remarried her post his mother's death as he thinks that they were having an extra-marital affair in their office and were responsible for her suicide. Naksh and Keerti get married. Initially marrying for Naira's sake, he begins to love Keerti. Kartik reconciles with Manish and accepts Swarna as his mother after his mother's depression and hallucinations were revealed to be the reason for her suicide. Naira fulfills her parent's dream of opening a dance academy and names it "Akshara Dance Academy" as a tribute to her mother. Swarna's son, Shubham dies of a drug overdose and Naira is blamed for hiding his drug addiction. Naira leaves as Kartik and Swarna refuse to trust her.

2 years later
Naira lives in Mumbai with Naitik. Kartik is the professor of the same class for which Naira signs up. Eventually, Kartik and Swarna realize their mistakes and reunite with Naira. Naira undergoes surgery due to a brain clot after which Naira and Kartik remarry. Later, Naira and Keerti become pregnant but Naira's child was born dead and Keerti, who had met with an accident gave birth to a boy and falls into a coma, Kartik swaps the babies and names the boy as Krish. Later, Keerti gets to know the truth about Kartik giving the child to Naira and Naira gets into shock about learning about her child's death and loses her memory in an accident. Eventually, Naira gets back her memory and reunites with Kartik.

Later, A pregnant Gayatri loses her fiance Vivaan and married Samarth, Suhasini's nephew. Naira enters the family business after Manish suffers a heart attack. Kartik feels insecure about Naira's busy routine. Naira finds out she is pregnant. Kartik questions Naira about her relationship with her business partner, Mihir. Naira rebukes him and storms out of the house without informing her pregnancy and meets with an accident. She is presumed to be dead by the family.

5 years later
Naira lives in Goa with their son Kairav. Kartik lives in guilt for not trusting Naira and finds solace in Vansh, Gayatri's son. Soon everyone learns that Naira is alive and Kairav is Naira and Kartik's son. Despite trying to get away from each other, Kartik and Naira become closer. Soon they realize their love and reunite. Kartik gets to know that his and Naira's daughter was sold off by an nurse to a group. 

3 months later, Naira is shattered to know about the missing baby from Kartik and Manish suffers from an accident after which he becomes mentally unstable. Few months later, Naira gives birth to a daughter and names her Akshara and Gayatri gives birth to a boy named Vatsal. Manish regains his memory and lives a normal life. More family drama leads to Naira and Kartik moving out with Kairav and Akshara. 3 months later, the family is reunited but meets with an accident. Naira falls off a cliff and dies. Kartik is left heartbroken.

Soon, Kairav meets a boxer named Sirat who is Naira's lookalike, which makes Kairav think that his mother has returned. After several demands from Kairav, Kartik brings Sirat and her grandmother to the Goenka house. Sirat reveals her former love Ranveer. Kartik realizes that Sirat and Ranveer had a misunderstanding, caused by Ranveer's father, Narendranath, and gets them married. Sirat falls for Kartik. Ranveer falls ill and asks Kartik to take care of Sirat. Ranveer dies and Narendranath holds Sirat responsible and gets her arrested on murder charges. Kartik bails her out and Sirat goes away from Kartik.

6 months later
Sirat shifts to Dalhousie changing her name to Simran and starts living with an elderly couple. Kartik comes to her as she missed previous two court-hearings and convinces her to return to Udaipur. Sirat and Kartik expose Narendranath and she is acquitted of all charges. They confess their love to each other and get married. Soon Sirat gives birth to a daughter, Aarohi. Sirat resumes her boxing training for a championship and qualifies for the Asian Championship.

8 years later
Akshara discovers that not Sirat, but Naira is her real mother. Sirat's mother, Sheela returns and manipulates Aarohi against the family. Kartik dies in a plane crash leaving the entire family in shock. Sirat slips down the stairs and falls to her death. Aarohi holds Akshara responsible for Sirat's death and starts detesting her.

12 years later
Akshara has grown up to be a kind and family-loving girl. She is a singer and musician. Aarohi aspires to be a doctor and still hates Akshara. Dr. Abhimanyu Birla is a practicing surgeon at Birla Hospital and Medical Institute. A love triangle is formed between the three. However, Aarohi and Abhimanyu's marriage is fixed after Akshara refuses to accept his love for Aarohi's sake. But soon Akshara and Abhimanyu confess their love in front of their families. Both families reach Jaipur and Akshara and Abhimanyu get married in a grand ceremony.

Later it is revealed that Harshvardhan was having a secret extra-marital affair with Dr. Avni Rathore and Neil is their illegitimate son. Manjari had brought Neil home through adoption. Manjari and Harshvardhan head for a divorce but Harshvardhan reforms himself and they reconcile.

Soon a fire breaks out at Birla Hospital and Abhimanyu suffers a pinched nerve in his right hand. Akshara contacts a renowned physiotherapist, Dr. Kunal Khera, for his treatment. Meanwhile, Anisha proposes to Kairav for marriage but Akshara learns about her having an affair with a married man and her plan to continue the affair post-marriage and confronts her for the same which Kairav overhears. Kairav refuses to marry Anisha for her betrayal and asks her to reveal the truth to the families. Anisha, who lacks the courage to tell this truth, commits suicide and the Birla family blames Kairav and Akshara for her death thinking Kairav murdered her and Akshara attempting to save him from murder charges. Later Dr. Kunal asks Akshara to sing secretly for his sister, Maya for a year in lieu of Abhimanyu's surgery to which she agrees.

1 year later
Akshara now lives incognito in Mauritius with Kunal and Maya and remains depressed due to her separation with Abhimanyu, who has misunderstood her and became a ruthless person. Akshara and Kairav come back to India and eventually Kairav is proven innocent. Abhimanyu and Akshara reunite and remarry. Neil and Aarohi elope and get married due to which Manish disowns her. Akshara successfully restores her lost identity as Maya's voice and resumes her singing career. 
	
Later, Akshara gets pregnant with twins while Aarohi is exposed for faking her pregnancy. However, Aarohi gets pregnant for real and Neil gives her second chance. In a bid to save some girls from kidnapping, Neil is beaten up by goons and Akshara miscarries. Before dying, Neil makes Abhimanyu promise to take care of Aarohi and his child. Akshara is blamed for Neil's death and Abhimanyu divorces her. Distraught, Akshara leaves the house and is helped by Abhinav. She finds that one of her twins is still alive. Manish requests Akshara to return to Goenkas', but she refuses and legally marries Abhinav.

6 years later
Akshara lives in Kasauli as a jam entrepreneur with her son, Abhir and Abhinav, who works as a tourist guide. On the other hand, Aarohi has became matured and Abhimanyu has taken the fatherly responsibility of her daughter, Ruhi while both works as senior doctors of Birla Hospital. Abhir considers Abhinav as his father while Ruhi is aware that Neil is her father. Manjiri starts forcing Abhimanyu and Aarohi to marry for Ruhi's sake despite their refusals while Akshara and Abhinav are forcing the same by their neighbour, Neelima. Soon, Abhimanyu visits Shimla for a medical meeting but gets stuck in Kasauli and ends up meeting Akshara, Abhinav and Abhir. Initially shocked, he decides to move on from Akshara accepting her new life. Abhimanyu and Aarohi decide to get married for Ruhi, who was bullied. Akshara, Abhinav and Abhir return to Udaipur for Suhasini's birthday, where restless Manjari announces Abhimanyu and Aarohi's marriage.

Cast

Main
Hina Khan as Akshara Maheshwari Singhania: Rajshree and Vishambhar's daughter; Shaurya's sister; Naitik's wife; Naksh and Naira's mother (2009–2016)
Karan Mehra as Naitik "Munna" Singhania: Gayatri and Rajshekar's son; Rashmi's brother; Akshara Singhania's widower; Naksh and Naira's father (2009–2016) 
Vishal Singh replaced Mehra as Naitik (2016–2018)
Shivangi Joshi as
Naira Singhania Goenka: Akshara Singhania and Naitik's daughter; Naksh's sister; Kartik's wife; Kairav and Akshara Goenka's mother (2016–2021)
Ashnoor Kaur as Young Naira Singhania (2015–2016)
Mishka Jain as Baby Naira Singhania (2015)
Sirat Shekhawat Goenka: Naira's lookalike; Sheela's daughter; Ranveer's widow; Kartik's wife; Kairav and Akshara Goenka's step-mother; Aarohi's mother (2021) 
Drashti Bhanushali as Young Sirat Shekhawat (2021)
Mohsin Khan as Kartik "Kittu" Goenka: Soumya and Manish's son; Swarna's step-son; Keerti's brother; Shubham's half-brother; Naira's widower; Sirat's husband; Kairav, Akshara Goenka and Aarohi's father (2016–2021)
Vedant Pandya as Young Kartik Goenka (2017)
Pranali Rathod as Akshara "Akshu" Goenka Sharma: Singer, former music therapist at Birla Hospital and Medical Institute; Naira and Kartik's daughter; Kairav's sister; Aarohi's half-sister; Abhimanyu's ex-wife; Abhir's mother; Abhinav's legal wife (2021–present)
Prachi Thakur as Young Akshara Goenka (2021)
Kairav Waghela as Baby Akshara Goenka (2020–2021)
Harshad Chopda as Dr. Abhimanyu "Abhi" Birla: Surgeon at Birla Hospital and Medical Institute; Manjari and Harshvardhan's son; Neil's half-brother; Akshara Goenka's ex-husband; Abhir's father; Ruhi's adoptive father (2021–present)
Het Makwana as Young Abhimanyu Birla (2022)

Recurring
Jay Soni as Abhinav Sharma: Akshara Goenka's legal husband; Abhir's adoptive father; Muskan's sworn brother (2022–present)
Karishma Sawant as Dr. Aarohi "Aaru" Goenka Birla: Doctor at Birla Hospital and Medical Institute; Sirat and Kartik's daughter; Kairav and Akshara Goenka's half-sister; Neil's widow; Ruhi's mother (2021–present)
Siya Makwana as Young Aarohi Goenka (2021)
Paras Priyadarshan as Neil Birla: Avni and Harshvardhan's son; Manjari's adopted son; Abhimanyu's half-brother; Aarohi's husband; Ruhi's father (2021–2022)
Shreyansh Kaurav as Abhir Birla: Akshara Goenka and Abhimanyu's son; Abhinav's adoptive son (2023–present)
Hera Mishra as Ruhi "Rooh" Birla: Aarohi and Neil's daughter; Abhimanyu's adoptive daughter (2023–present)
Mayank Arora as Kairav Goenka – Naira and Kartik's son; Sirat's step-son; Akshara Goenka's brother; Aarohi's half-brother; Anisha's ex-fiancé (2021–2022)
Abeer Singh Godhwani replaced Arora as Kairav (2023-present)
Shaurya Shah as Young Kairav Goenka (2019)
Tanmay Shah replaced Shaurya Shah as Young Kairav (2019–2020)
Aarambh Trehan replaced Tanmay Shah as Young Kairav (2020–2021)
Krishiv Mutha as Baby Kairav Goenka (2019)
Sharan Anandani as Vansh Goenka – Gayatri Deora and Vivan's son; Samarth's step-son; Vatsal's half-brother (2021–2022)
Maaz Champ as Young Vansh Goenka (2019–2020)
Siddharth Dubey replaced Maaz Champ as Young Vansh (2020–2021)
Swati Chitnis as Suhasini Ajmera Goenka aka Mimi – Matriarch of Goenkas; Tejaswini and Purushottam's sister; Manish and Akhilesh's mother; Keerti, Kartik, Shubham, Manasi, Luv and Kush's grandmother; Krish, Kairav, Akshara Goenka and Aarohi's great-grandmother (2016–present)
Parul Chauhan as Swarna Goenka – Manish's second wife; Shubham's mother; Keerti and Kartik's step-mother; Krish, Kairav, Akshara Goenka and Aarohi's step-grandmother; Abhir and Ruhi's step-great-grandmother (2016–2019)
Niyati Joshi replaced Chauhan as Swarna (2019-present)
Sachin Tyagi as Manish Goenka – Suhasini's elder son; Akhilesh's brother; Saumya's widower and Swarna's husband; Keerti, Kartik and Shubham's father; Krish, Kairav, Akshara Goenka and Aarohi's grandfather; Abhir and Ruhi's great-grandfather (2016–present)
Nupur Joshi as Saumya Goenka – Priyanka's sister; Manish's first wife; Keerti and Kartik's mother; Krish, Kairav, Akshara Goenka and Aarohi's grandmother (2017) (Dead)
Ali Hassan as Akhilesh "Akhil" Goenka aka AG – Suhasini's younger son; Manish's brother; Surekha's husband; Mansi, Luv and Kush's father (2016–2022)
Shilpa Raizada as Surekha Goenka – Akhilesh's wife, Mansi, Luv and Kush's mother (2016–2021)
Saee Barve replaced Raizada as Surekha (2023–present)
Kanchi Singh as Gayatri "Gayu" Deora – Rashmi and Nikhil's daughter; Sameer's step-daughter; Naksh and Naira's cousin; Vivan's fiancée; Samarth's ex-wife; Vansh and Vatsal's mother (2016–2017)
Deblina Chatterjee replaced Singh as Gayatri(2018–2019)
Simran Khanna replaced Chatterjee as Gayatri(2019–2021)
Payal Bhojwani as Young Gayatri Deora (2015–2016)
Zenia Shastiker as Baby Gayatri Deora (2014–2015)
Devaj Bhanushali as Baby Vatsal Goenka – Gayatri Deora and Samarth's son; Vansh's half-brother (2020)
Anmol Jyotir as Luv Goenka – One of Surekha and Akhilesh's twin sons; Mansi and Kush's brother (2020–2021)
Shreshth Saxena as Young Luv Goenka (2016–2019)
Apoorv Jyotir as Kush Goenka – One of Surekha and Akhilesh's twin sons; Mansi and Luv's brother (2020-2021)
Shubh Saxena as Young Kush Goenka (2016–2019)
Anita Kanwal as Tejaswini Ajmera – Suhasini and Purushottam's sister (2018)
Gaurav Wadhwa as Shubham "Aryan" Goenka – Manish and Swarna's son; Keerti and Kartik's half-brother (2017–2018) (Dead)
Samir Onkar as Samarth Goenka – Suhasini's nephew; Manish and Akhilesh's cousin; Gayatri Deora's ex-husband; Vatsal's father; Vansh's step-father (2018–2020)
Preyal Shah as Reem – Akshara Goenka and Abhimanyu's wedding planner; Vansh's love-interest (2021–2022)
Ami Trivedi as Manjari Birla – Mahima's sister; Harshvardhan's wife; Abhimanyu's mother; Neil's adoptive mother; Abhir's grandmother; Ruhi's adoptive grandmother (2021–present)
Vinay Jain as Dr. Harshvardhan "Harsh" Birla – PhD doctor; Anandvardhan's brother; Manjari's husband; Abhimanyu and Neil's father; Abhir and Ruhi's grandfather (2021–2023)
Pragati Mehra as Dr. Mahima Birla – Heart surgeon; Manjari's sister; Anandvardhan's wife; Parth, Anisha and Nishtha's mother; Shivansh's grandmother (2021–present)
Ashish Nayyar as Dr. Anandvardhan "Anand" Birla – Heart surgeon; Harshvardhan's brother; Mahima's husband; Parth, Anisha and Nishtha's father; Shivansh's grandfather (2021–present)
Neeraj Goswami as Dr. Parth Birla – Doctor and musician; Mahima and Anandvardhan's son; Anisha and Nishtha's brother; Shefali's husband; Shivansh's father (2021–present)
Sehrish Ali as Shefali Birla – Former Journalist; Parth's wife; Shivansh's mother (2021) 
Nisha Nagpal replaced Ali as Shefali (2021–present)
Orrish Arora as Baby Shivansh "Shivu" Birla – Parth and Shefali's son (2022–2023)
Kashish Rai as Anisha Birla – Mahima and Anandvardhan's elder daughter; Parth and Nishtha's sister; Kairav's ex-fiancée (2022)
Niharika Chouksey as Nishtha Birla – Mahima and Anandvardhan's younger daughter; Parth and Anisha's sister (2021–2022)
Nancy Roy replaced Chouksey as Nishtha(2022-present)
Pankaj Bijlani as Dr. Rohan Shah – Doctor at Birla Hospital and Medical Institute; Abhimanyu's best-friend (2021–present)
Farida Dadi as Neelima aka Amma – Akshara Goenka and Abhinav's neighbour and helper; Muskan's grandmother; Abhinav's sworn grandmother (2023–present)
Shambhavi Singh as Muskan – Neelima's granddaughter; Abhinav and Akshara Goenka's neighbour and helper; Abhinav's sworn sister; Akshara's friend (2023–present)
Mrunal Jain as Dr. Kunal Khera: Abhimanyu's physiotherapist; Maya's brother who asks Akshara Goenka to hide her real identity and sing for his sister in lieu of Abhimanyu's surgery (2022)
Navika Kotia as:
Maaya "Mau" Khera- Dr. Kunal Khera's sister for whom Akshara Goenka was asked to live incognito and sing secretly in lieu of Abhimanyu's surgery by Kunal (2022)
Prerna "Chikki" Singhania – Gayatri Singhania and Rajshekhar's adoptive daughter (2013–2014)
Reem Shaikh as Young Prerna (2012)
Medha Jambotakar as Kaveri Singhania aka Bhabhimaa – Mahendra's widow; Nandini's mother; Anmol's grandmother; Yash's adoptive grandmother (2009–2021)
Sanjai Gandhi as Mahendra Pratap Singhania aka Daddaji – Patriarch of Singhanias; Parvati and Rajshekhar's brother; Kaveri's husband; Nandini's father; Anmol's grandfather; Yash's adoptive grandfather (2009–2010)
Abhijeet Lahiri replaced Gandhi as Mahendra(2010–2015)
Sandeep Mehta as Rajshekhar "Raj" Singhania – Mahendra and Parvati's brother; Gayatri Singhania's widower; Devyani's husband; Naitik and Rashmi's father; Muskan and Naman's step-father; Naksh, Gayatri Deora and Naira's grandfather; Mishti's step-grandfather (2009–2018)
Sonali Verma as Gayatri Singhania aka Chhoti Dulhan– Rajshekhar's wife; Naitik and Rashmi's mother; Naksh, Gayatri Deora and Naira's grandmother (2009–2013) 
Kshitee Jog as Devyani Singhania – Ayurvedic doctor; Suresh's ex-wife; Rajshekar's wife; Naman and Muskan's mother; Naitik and Rashmi's step-mother; Mishti's grandmother; Naksh, Gayatri Deora and Naira's step-grandmother (2014–2021)
Rohan Mehra as Naksh "Duggu" Singhania – Akshara Singhania and Naitik's son; Naira's brother; Keerti's husband; Krish's father (2015–2016)
Rishi Dev replaced Mehra as Naksh(2016-2018)
Shehzad Shaikh replaced Dev as Naksh(2018-2021)
Shivansh Kotia as Young Naksh Singhania (2012–2015)
Harsh Bani as Baby Naksh Singhania (2012)
Bani replaced Harsh as Baby Naksh (2012)
Mohena Singh as Keerti Goenka Singhania – Soumya and Manish's daughter; Swarna's step-daughter; Kartik's sister; Shubham's half-sister; Naksh's wife; Krish's mother (2016–2019)
Harsha Khandeparkar replaced Singh as Keerti(2020-2021)
Saksham Vasu as Krish Singhania – Naksh and Keerti's son; Kairav, Akshara Goenka and Aarohi's cousin (2020–2021)
Dwiti Gajera as Baby Krish Singhania (2019)
Zarina Roshan Khan as Muskan Agrawal Awasthi – Devyani and Suresh's daughter; Naman's sister; Alok's wife (2014–2015)
Amit Dolawat as Alok Awasthi – Akshara Singhania's college-mate and former admirer; Muskan's husband (2009; 2014–2015)
Anshul Pandey as Naman Agrawal – Devyani and Suresh's son; Muskan's brother; Karishma's former husband; Mishti's father (2014–2016)
Pooran Kiri as Suresh Agrawal – Devyani's ex-husband; Naman and Muskan's father (2014–2015)
Priyanka Udhwani as Karishma Agrawal – Naman's ex-wife; Mishti's mother (2014–2017)
Rhea Sharma as Mishti Agrawal Rajvansh – Karishma and Naman's daughter (2019)
Aarna Sharma as Child and Teenage Mishti (2015–2017; 2019)
Neha Saroopa as Rashmi Singhania Desai – Gayatri Singhania and Rajshekar's daughter; Naitik's sister; Nikhil's ex-wife; Sameer's wife; Gayatri Deora's mother (2009-2016) 
Mazher Sayed as Sameer Desai – Rashmi's husband; Gayatri Deora's step-father (2015–2016) 
Shravani Goswami as Rama Deora – Rajendra's wife; Nikhil's mother; Gayatri Deora's grandmother (2011–2016; 2018–2020)
Nidhi Uttam as Nandini Singhania Chauhan – Kaveri and Mahendra's daughter; Mohit's wife; Yash's adoptive mother, Anmol's mother (2009–2019)
Ayush Agarwal as Mohit Chauhan – Rukmini's son; Koyal's brother; Nandini's husband; Yash's adoptive father; Anmol's father (2009–2015)
Shamik Abbas replaced Agarwal as Mohit(2015–2019)
Sanchit Sharma as Yash Chauhan – Nandini and Mohit's adopted son; Anmol's adoptive brother; Rose's husband (2015–2017)
Ansh Kaul as Young Yash Chauhan (2012–2015)
Sippora Zoutewelle as Rose Wilkins Chauhan – Yash's wife, Martha's daughter (2016)
Karan Pahwa as Anmol Chauhan – Nandini and Mohit's son; Yash's adopted brother; Mansi's husband (2016; 2018–2019)
Atharva Padhye as Young Anmol Chauhan (2015–2016)
Shreya Sharma as Mansi Goenka Chauhan – Surekha and Akhilesh's daughter; Luv and Kush's sister; Anmol's wife (2017)
Vaishnavi Rao replaced Sharma as Mansi(2018–2019)
Urmila Sharma as Rukmini Chauhan – Mohit and Koyal's mother; Yash's adoptive grandmother; Anmol's grandmother (2009–2012)
Sunitha Rao replaced Sharma as Rukmini(2012–2019; 2021)
Trishikha Tiwari as Koyal Chauhan – Rukmini's daughter; Mohit's sister (2009–2012)
Rakesh Deewana as Maharaj – Singhania's chef (2009–2014)
Divya Bhatnagar as Gulabo – Singhania's househelp (2009–2011)
Ali Merchant as Rituraj Singhania – Nandini, Naitik and Rashmi's cousin (2009; 2011–2012)
Preeti Sharma as Bindiya Singhania – Rituraj's wife (2009; 2011–2012)
Kirti Sually as Parvati Singhania aka Baisa – Mahendra and Rajshekhar's sister; Nandini, Naitik and Rashmi's aunt (2010–2019)
Nea Srivastav as Girija – Singhania's househelp (2011–2016)
Ashish Kapoor as Nikhil Deora – Rajendra and Rama's son; Rashmi's ex-husband; Gayatri Deora's father (2011–2013)
Manoj Jaiswal as Rajendra Deora – Rama's husband; Nikhil's father (2011–2013)
Umang Jain as Nayantara "Tara" Singh Shekhawat – Naksh's former fiancée (2015–2016)
Lata Sabharwal as Rajshri Goyal Maheshwari – Ramola's daughter; Ratan's sister; Vishambharnath's wife; Shaurya and Akshara Singhania's mother; Ananya, Naksh, Naira and Kuhu's grandmother (2009–2019)
Sanjeev Seth as Vishambharnath "Vishambhar" Maheshwari – Bhairavi's elder son; Omkarnath's brother; Rajshri's husband; Shaurya and Akshara Singhani's father; Ananya, Naksh, Naira and Kuhu's grandfather (2009–2018)
Vineeta Malik as Bhairavi Maheshwari – Vishambharnath and Omkarnath's mother; Shaurya, Akshara Singhania and Anshuman's grandmother (2009–2018)
Neelima Taddepalli as Sunaina Maheshwari – Omkarnath's wife; Anshuman's mother; Nishant's grandmother (2009–2018)
Manu Malik as Omkarnath "Omi" Maheshwari – Bhairavi's younger son; Vishambharnath's brother; Sunaina's husband; Anshuman's father; Nishant's grandfather (2009–2018)
Ather Habib as Shaurya Maheshwari – Rajshri and Vishambharnath's son; Akshara Singhania's brother; Varsha's husband; Ananya and Kuhu's father (2009–2013)
Yash Gera replaced Habib as Shaurya(2013–2017)
Pooja Joshi Arora as Varsha Maheshwari – Sulekha's daughter; Shaurya's wife; Akshara Singhania's best-friend; Ananya's mother; Kuhu's adoptive mother (2009–2020)
Aman Sharma as Anshuman "Anshu" Maheshwari – Sunaina and Omkar's son; Jasmeet's husband; Nishant's father (2009–2015)
Dheeraj Gumbar replaced Sharma as Anshuman(2015–2016)
Shirin Sewani as Jasmeet "Jassi" Kaur Sethi Maheshwari – Sukhwinder and Pammi's daughter; Anshuman's wife; Nishant's mother (2013-2018)
Akshaya Naik as Ananya Maheshwari Sharma – Varsha and Shaurya's daughter; Kuhu's half-sister; Ranveer's wife (2015–2018)
Nairtiya Chandola as Young Ananya Maheshwari (2012–2015)
Arjun Kohli as Ranveer Sharma – Ananya's husband (2016–2018)
Anmol Jyotir as Nishant "Nannu" Maheshwari – Anshuman and Jasmeet's son (2016-2017)
Khushmeet Gill as Young Nishant (2015–2016)
Kaveri Priyam as Kuhu Maheshwari Rajvansh – Shaurya and Sneha's daughter; Varsha's adoptive daughter; Ananya's half-sister (2019)
Yamini Makwana as Teenage Kuhu Maheshwari (2016–2017)
Harbandna Kaur as Young Kuhu Maheshwari (2016)
Zarina Roshan Khan as Gopi – Bhairavi's friend and househelp (2009–2014)
Anand Mani as Bhajinder Singh – Maheshwari's househelp; Dhaniya's husband (2009–2012)
Amardeep Jha as Shankari Tai – Maheshwari's match maker (2009–2016,2018)
Bhuvan Chopra as Ratan Goyal – Ramola's son; Rajshri's brother; Shaurya and Akshara Singhania's uncle (2009)
Ruma Sengupta as Ramola Goyal – Rajshri and Ratan's mother; Shaurya and Akshara Singhania's grandmother (2009–2011) 
Charu Asopa as Sneha – Naitik's employee; Kuhu's mother (2010) 
Tiya Gandwani as Dr. Priyanka – Soumya's sister; Keerti and Kartik's aunt (2017–2019)
Rituraj Singh as Purushottam Ajmera – Suhasini's brother; Ila's father (2019)
Aleya Ghosh as Ila Ajmera – Purushottam's daughter (2019)
Pankhuri Awasthy Rode as Vedika – Kartik's friend and former fiancée. (2019–2020)
Tejaswanee Bhadane as Krishna "Chhori" Goenka – Kartik and Naira's adoptive daughter; Kairav, Akshara Goenka and Aarohi's adoptive sister (2020–2021)
Shrey Pareek as Kabir - Naira's stalker (2018)
Priyamvada Kant as Rhea – Surekha's niece (2021)
Ashita Dhawan as Sheela Shekhawat Rathore – Kaushalya's daughter; Mukesh's wife; Sirat and Sonu's mother; Aarohi's grandmother (2021)
Hrishikesh Pandey as Mukesh Rathore – Sheila's second husband; Sonu's father (2021)
Krishang Bhanushali as Sonu Rathore – Sheila and Mukesh's son; Sirat's half-brother (2021)
Amita Khopkar as Kaushalya Shekhawat aka Maudi – Sheila's mother; Sirat and Sonu's grandmother; Aarohi's great-grandmother. (2021) 
Karan Kundrra as Ranveer Chauhan – Narendranath and Saroj's son; Nidhi's brother; Sirat's first husband (2021) 
Mayank Padia as Teenage Ranveer Chauhan (2021)
Shahbaz Khan as Narendranath Chauhan – Saroj's husband; Ranveer and Nidhi's father (2021)
 Anjali Gupta as Saroj Chauhan – Narendranath's wife; Ranveer and Nidhi's mother (2021)
 Ashwini Shukla as Nidhi Chauhan – Narendranath and Saroj's daughter; Ranveer's sister (2021)
Vrushika Mehta as Dr. Riddhima – Kairav's psychiatrist (2020)

Guest appearances

Production

Development

Filming of the show began on 11 September 2008. It was launched at Rambagh Palace in Jaipur, Rajasthan. In January 2009, the series was promoted through a campaign at six main cities by StarPlus along with Jagran Solutions. A contest was held in the country among over 1000 married couples out of which fifty of them were selected through events like quizzes and on air test on radios. They were made to remarry with the rituals along with the games and events held in Rambagh Palace.

In January 2010, a sequence was shot without any dialogue, with only background music used during dramatic scenes when the Singhania family learn that the character Akshara motivates the love between her sister in law Nandhini and Naitik's friend Mohit, against them.

In January 2013, Yeh Rishta Kya Kehlata Hai was sent notice by channel for its ending due to decreasing ratings. However it received extension until June 2013 while the ratings rose and the decision of ending was dropped. Besides, twice again it received notice for ending but soon when the ratings increased after it, the plan was dropped and the series continued.

During November 2014, lead Hina Khan could not attend shooting for a few days due to her other work schedules and the track was altered for her absence. In December 2014, a scene where characters Naman and Karishma kiss was cut from the broadcast to avoid offending the show's audience.

The show took its first leap of 4 years on 30 November 2012 after the car accident of Naitik as he slips into a coma. It then took a leap of 10 years on 30 March 2015 after Kaveri banished Akshara from the house owing to Mahendra Pratap's death. Then a leap of some years was taken on 16 May 2016 after teenage Naira running away from her home fearing imprisonment. Another leap of 2 years was taken on 21 May 2018 after Shubam's death as Suvarna ousts her. It took a leap of 5 years on 7 June 2019 after Naira leaves the Goenka house on Kartik's misconception about her. On 18 October 2021, The show took a leap of 8 years where Sirat was shown a single mother to Aarohi and Akshara while Kartik was abroad to drop teenaged Kairav and Vansh to hostels. On 27 October 2021, a leap of 12 years was taken after Kartik and Sirat's deaths and the story started focussing on Abhimanyu and grown up Akshara and Aarohi. On 25 August 2022, the show took a leap of 1 year where Akshara was helping Dr. Kunal's sister, Maya, and was living away from her family and Abhimanyu. On 6 January 2023, show took another leap of 6 years and it was shown that while Akshara is raising her son Abhir after legally marrying Abhinav in Kasauli hiding the truth of him being Abhimanyu's biological son and Aarohi is raising her and Neil's daughter Ruhi as a single mother post Neil's death with Abhimanyu fulfilling her fatherly responsibilities.

The 10 year leap in March 2015 was slightly delayed as the casting of adult Naksh was not finalised. Producers auditioned over 200 people before choosing Rohan Mehra. In April 2016, both Hina Khan and Karan Mehra refused to play the role as in-laws after the on-going wedding track of their onscreen son Naksh and Tara. Thus, the track was altered such that the wedding was called off.

During January 2017, at the filming of pre-wedding sequences of the lead characters Naira and Kartik, fire broke out on the sets due to a short circuit. Common people were auditioned at Delhi during 4 and 5 February 2017 and cast for Baraati in Naira and Kartik's wedding.

In August 2017, the wedding dress of the character Keerti, for her and Naksh's marriage sequence, was designed by Bollywood fashion designer Neeta Lulla.

Pankhuri Awasthy was cast in June 2019 as Vedika, whose role was supposed to be for three months. However, with the increased ratings, becoming most watched Hindi GEC for few weeks in urban, her role was extended with her exit in January 2020 while in between she took a break in October and re-entered in November 2019.

Speaking about Yeh Rishta Kya Kehlata Hai's success producer Rajan Shahi said, "Yeh Rishta Kya Kehlata Hai doing well is something we have to strive for each and every day. When a show completes this number of episodes, it becomes a challenge as to how to sustain the show. There are so many topics to choose from and there are so many relationships, so that becomes a major challenge, to keep the freshness alive. Drama, intrigue, etc is just a part of storytelling but to still keep the essence alive that is the challenge, it is always a day to day battle". He also quoted that the elaborate festival celebrations shown is the strength of the series.

Speaking about the introduction of transition in the story from Akshara and Naitik to Naira and Kartik, Shahi said, "We were losing out on the young audience when things were going sweet between (original protagonists) Akshara and Naitik. With the introduction of Kartik and Naira -- a couple that is imperfect, makes mistake and learns from the mistakes -- the audience again found a connection with the on-screen characters. That is how our show has stood strong against the test of time". In May 2017 Shahi stated:  For his above statement both Khan and Mehra expressed their displeasure where Khan stated:  Mehra stated: 

In May 2022, actress Pranali Rathod worn a bridal lehenga worth ₹2.5 Lacs approximately for Akshara and Abhimanyu's wedding sequence, the costliest lehenga ever worn by any YRKKH actress. It was also reported that the whole wedding sequence which was shot in Samode Palace of Jaipur costed a budget around ₹2 Crores including whole cast's stay and special Rajasthani traditional costumes, the highest ever budget spent on marriage sequence of any Indian television series.

Casting

Hina Khan was cast to play Akshara Singhania, making her acting debut. Khan stated that she knew nothing about acting while signing the series quoting, "I didn't learn acting from anywhere. I think it's because of luck that I landed up in TV. Even after that I had to do a lot of hard work. It was more difficult for me when I began acting and straight away I had to perform. I never got to learn". Karan Tacker was initially roped for the role of Naitik, but was replaced by Karan Mehra a day before the promo shoot as Tacker became skeptical. Speaking about it producer Rajan Shahi said, "Karan refused to be a part of the show a day and a half prior to shooting the promo. I needed to hunt for a new face on immediate basis. I accidentally met Karan Mehra, a real life replica of my fictitious character Naitik".

In June 2016, Mehra quit the show, because of health issues. Two sequences were shot before his exit: one was his death track and other was his kidnap track and decision was made to take the story with the kidnapping track. Then, he was replaced by Vishal Singh in August 2016, making his entry with the kidnapping sequence in Switzerland. In November 2016, Hina Khan quit as her character became monotonous for her and she was shown killed in a car accident. Shivangi Joshi playing Naira and Mohsin Khan playing Kartik, who entered in May 2016, became the leads as the story focused on their journey.

In 2012, Sanjay Gandhi playing Mahendra quit due to the issues between him and his co-actors Sonali Verma and Sandeep Mehta who was then replaced by Abhijit Lahiri. The latter also quit after the death of his character in March 2015. In 2012, Urmila Sharma was replaced by Sunitha Rao as Rukmini.In September 2013, Ather Habib playing Shaurya quit as he felt nothing more was there to explore in his character and was replaced by Yash Gera. Gera also quit in 2017 due to the same reason as that of Habib. He was replaced by Sameer Sharma in the spin-off series during March 2019. In December 2013, Sonali Verma quit her role as Gayathri Singhania, because Verma planned to get married and move to the United States. Her character was killed after a fall from a cliff.

In 2015, Aman Sharma playing Anshuman quit as he wanted to search for better opportunities and was replaced by Dheeraj Gumbar who also quit in mid 2016.

In 2015, Ayush Agarwal quit due to personal reasons and was replaced by Shamik Abbas. In May 2016, Umang Jain playing Nayantara and her on-screen family members quit as the story started to focus on other tracks after the cancellation of her and Naksh's wedding in the show after Hina Khan playing Akshara refused to play the role of a mother-in-law.

In September 2016, Rohan Mehra playing Naksh quit to participate in Bigg Boss and was replaced by Rishi Dev. Dev also quit in December 2018 as he wished to focus on his YouTube channel and was replaced by Shehzad Shaikh. In September 2017, Kanchi Singh playing Gayatri Deora quit as her character was sidelined and was replaced by Deblina Chatterjee in November 2018.

Anshul Pandey playing Naman quit in October 2016 who was replaced by Jay Pathak in the spin-off series during March 2019. In January 2018, Priyanka Udhwani playing Karishma quit as nothing was left for her character. In July 2018, Vaishnavi Rao was cast as Mansi which was earlier played by Shreya Sharma as the makers considered the former better for the role. Shirin Sewani who was last seen in November 2018 playing Jasmeet in this series was replaced by Soniya Kaur in the spin-off series in March 2019.

Parul Chauhan quit in April 2019 as she did not want to play a grandmother and was replaced by Niyati Joshi as Swarna. As the story was about to take a leap, in May 2019, Mohena Singh playing Keerti quit after getting married, and was replaced by Harsha Khandeparkar in August 2020. Deblina Chatterjee playing Gayatri quit as she was not interested in playing a mother, and was replaced by Simran Khanna. Sreshth Saxena and Shubh Saxena also quit due to the leap as their characters need to be shown as grown up teenagers. Shaurya Shah, who entered in June 2019 as Kairav, quit the following month due to health issues, and was immediately replaced by Tanmay Rishi.

In January 2020, Anmol Jyotir who played teenage Nishanth Maheshwari until 2017 was cast along with his real life twin Apoorva Jyotir to play teenage Kush and Luv. As a result of COVID-19 pandemic restrictions, actors younger than ten years of age were prohibited from performing on set, so when shooting resumed in June 2020, Tanmay Rishi Shah and Maaz Champ shot their sequences from home. However, due to the requirement of characters Kairav and Vansh on the sets, they were replaced by Aarambh Trehan Sehgal and Siddharth Dubey in October 2020. Actress Vrushika Mehta was cast to do a cameo Dr. Riddhima in November 2020 and completed her sequences in December 2020.

In October 2021, Mohsin Khan playing Kartik left the show as well as child actors Aarambh Trehan Sehgal and Siddharth Dubey. Shivangi Joshi playing Sirat and actresses Shilpa Raizada and Simran Khanna playing Surekha and Gayatri respectively left the show after the 8 year leap sequence post the next generation leap, Pranali Rathod was cast to play Akshara Goenka and Harshad Chopda was cast to play Dr. Abhimanyu Birla. About her role, Rathod said "I relate to the character so much that I instantly fell in love with the way it has been written. Also, in real life, I'm free-spirited just like Akshara". Karishma Sawant was cast as Aarohi Goenka, making her acting debut. Mayank Arora and Sharan Anandani played Kairav Goenka and Vansh Goenka post the generation leap. Ami Trivedi was cast as Manjari Birla and Paras Priyadarshan as Neil Birla. Vinay Jain, Pragati Mehra and Ashish Nayyar were cast as Dr. Harshvardhan Birla, Dr. Mahima Birla and Dr. Anandvardhan Birla. Neeraj Goswami, Niharika Chouksey and Sehrish Ali were cast to play Parth Birla, Nishtha Birla and Shefali Birla. However Ali was replaced by actress Nisha Nagpal days after introduction of the third generation.

In February 2022, Kashish Rai joined the cast as Anand and Mahima's elder daughter Anisha Birla, and she quit the following month. But she returned and permanently left the series in August 2022 through her character's death.

In June 2022, Niharika Chouksey portraying Nishtha Birla quit the series quoting, "I waited for six months but there was nothing for me to do in the show". In August 2022, Mrunal Jain was cast to play Dr. Kunal Khera. Actress Navika Kotia, who previously played Prerna Singhania from 2013 to 2014 joined the cast again in August 2022 to play a new character Maya Khera.

In December 2022, Sharan Anandani playing Vansh Goenka quit the series and said, "My character never had any growth since long and was unhappy with tracks as I can't remain silent actor standing in background at this stage of my career". In the same month, Paras Priyadarshan who portrayed Neil Birla quit the series as "he didn't wanted to play role of a father owing to the following leap in the show". Jay Soni entered the show as Abhinav Sharma. Mayank Arora who portrayed Kairav Goenka quit the series as "he wished to explore more as an actor and felt that now he should bid adeau to Kairav". Following the pre-leap exists child actors Shreyansh Kaurav and Hera Mishra were cast to play Akshara's son Abhir Birla and Aarohi's daughter Ruhi Birla respectively for post-leap sequences in January 2023. In the same month actor Abeer Singh Godhwani replaced Mayank as Kairav Goenka while actress Shambhavi Singh was cast opposite him as Muskan.

In late February 2023 actress Saee Barve entered the series as Surekha Goenka which was previously played by actress Shilpa Raizada from 2016 to 2021.

Filming
The series is mainly filmed in the Film City at Goregaon in Mumbai. As the story is based in Udaipur of Rajasthan, some scenes were filmed there. In December 2013, a sequence was shot at Wai. Sequences were also filmed in Rishikesh during 2016 and March 2018. In March 2017, the wedding track of Kartik and Naira was filmed in Bikaner, Rajasthan.

The show as also filmed in various foreign locations including Bangkok in 2014, Cape Town in 2015, Hong Kong in 2015, Switzerland in 2016 and Greece in 2017.

On 13 April 2021, Maharashtra's Chief Minister Uddhav Thackeray announced a sudden curfew due to increased Covid cases in Maharashtra, while the production halted from 14 April 2021 and the production and filming location was soon shifted temporarily from Mumbai to Silvassa along with other shows Anupamaa, Aai Kuthe Kay Karte and Mann Kee Awaaz Pratigya 2 of the same production house. After two months of shooting in Silvassa, the team shifted back to Film City, Mumbai on 10 June 2021.

In October 2021, the team flew to Udaipur to shoot initial episodes after the generation leap including introduction sequences.

In April 2022 to May 2022, the team flew to Jaipur to shoot Abhimanyu and Akshara's wedding sequence.

Broadcast

The series which was in a continuous production since its premiere was halted indefinitely in March 2020. Owing COVID-19 outbreak in India, the filming of the television series and films were halted on 19 March 2020, expected to resume the works from 1 April 2020 and the series airing was halted on 25 March 2020 after the bank episodes got over. However, later on imposing the nationwide lockdown, which was extending with the increasing cases, filming could not be resumed since March end. After three months, the shooting of the series resumed on 26 June 2020 and airing resumed from 13 July 2020. 

The production once again halted on 24 August 2020 when the cast Sachin Tyagi, Swati Chitnis and Samir Onkar along with four crew members were tested positive for the COVID-19 virus and resumed with others on 28 August 2020. Since 2 October 2022, it is broadcast daily along with other Star Plus's shows.

Spin-off

In 2019, On Yeh Rishta Kya Kehlata Hai's completion of 10 years, a spin-off series, Yeh Rishtey Hain Pyaar Ke, premiered on 18 March 2019 starring Rhea Sharma and Shaheer Sheikh. The series portrayed the life of Naman and Karishma's daughter and Naira's younger step cousin Mishti, portrayed by Sharma alongside Abir portrayed by Sheikh.

Crossovers
Yeh Rishta Kya Kehlata Hai has had several crossover episodes with various shows. They are as follows:

 On 28 December 2009, the show had a crossover with Sapna Babul Ka...Bidaai. 

 On 24 August 2012, the show had a crossover episode with Diya Aur Baati Hum. 

 On 3 March 2016, actress Deepika Singh as Sandhya from Diya Aur Baati Hum made an entry during Naira's kidnap sequence. 

 Yeh Rishta Kya Kehlata Hai and Yeh Rishtey Hain Pyaar Ke had an integration from 12 March 2019 to 16 March 2019. Rhea Sharma as Mishti and Kaveri Priyam as Kuhu were introduced during the integration. 

 From 26 March 2022 to 28 March 2022, Anupamaa from Anupamaa, attended Akshara and Abhimanyu's engagement.

Dubbed versions
From 2011 to 2015, the show was dubbed as Uravugal Thorarkadhai in Tamil on Star Vijay and as Pellante Noorella Panta in Telugu on Star Maa, both being discontinued after airing more than 1000 episodes. In 2017, the show was dubbed in Malayalam under the title Akkareyanente Maanasam 2 on Asianet Plus and also in Tamil as Uravugal Thodarkadhai 2 on Star Vijay Super from episode 2075, but were discontinued within few months.

Television specials

Rishton Ka Utsav (2018)
A special segment named Rishton Ka Utsav aired from 26 November 2018 to 5 December 2018 where Kartik and Naira organize a unique festival which brings all generations with most of the family members of the show through all these years come together and celebrate their reunion. This segment also marked the entry of Deblina Chatterjee as Gayatri Deora replacing Kanchi Singh who quit the show in 2017.

Ravivaar With Star Parivaar (2022)

The cast of Yeh Rishta Kya Kehlata Hai participated as a team in the musical game show Ravivaar With Star Parivaar. It competed with the teams of other Star Plus's shows. Yeh Rishta Kya Kehlata Hai emerged as the winner of the show winning the trophy and a prize money of 10 lac rupees.

Reception

Impact
Yeh Rishta Kya Kehlata Hai was touted as the biggest weekday prime time fiction launch in past three years during 2009.

This longest running Hindi soap is the fourth longest-running Indian television soap opera and is still one of the top rated shows. It was the first Hindi show to cross 2,500 episodes. It completed 3,000 episodes on 11 September 2019 creating a history in the Indian television. On 1 September 2021, It completed 3500 episodes. On 4th March 2023, It completed 4000 episodes successfully.

Hina participated in the 'Power of 49' campaign, in which soap opera actors used their influence to urge women to vote.

Khan was paid with ₹1to 1.25 Lacks per episode as of in 2015 and 2016 making her one of the highest paid Indian television actress.

In 2020, it became the third most tweeted Indian television show on Twitter.

Critics

Shoma Munshi in their book Prime Time Soap Operas on Indian Television said the show has "simplicity and highly emotional content" and was noted for placing female characters in the historical tradition of a large joint family.

The Indian Express stated, "Simple story, simple treatment, easy pace, small tiffs, grouse, grief, happiness, sadness, celebrations, rituals, customs but no melodrama and no scheming and plotting....that's every day life beautifully captured and which pleases eyes, ears and other senses. Not that it has not resorted to TRP gimmicks like misunderstanding, pregnancy and miscarriage to come out of its lows, but the show has chronicled post-marriage journey of an arranged married couple quite well". They also quoted, "There is a sense of positivity and reality in the show, that no other serial offers on the small screen".

Praising the two shows Bidaii and Yeh Rishta Kya Kehlata Hai of Rajan Shahi's Director's Kut Production as game changers of Starplus which do not have excessive camera moves and mother in law - daughter in law melodramas unlike previously aired dramas, The Times of India stated, "The shows adequately highlighted the quintessential emotions with loads of romanticism and simplicity in story-telling".

Speaking on the success of the series, The New Indian Express said, "Like most successful television series in our country, "Yeh Rishta Kya Kehlata Hai" has always banked heavily on the great Indian family. However, the show, along with its cast, has changed over the decade, to accommodate changing times. Perhaps that is where the winning formula lies—in retaining its old core values in an ever-changing set-up".

Soundtrack

Yeh Rishta Kya Kehlata Hais soundtrack has been composed by Navin Tripathi and Manish Tripathi. The lyrics are penned by Manish Tripathi. The title track "Haan Koi Chori Chori" has been sung by Navin Tripathi and Alka Yagnik.

Awards
Note: Only notable awards are listed below.

Indian Television Academy Awards

Indian Telly Awards

Star Guild Awards

BIG Star Entertainment Awards

Gold Awards

See also 
 List of programs broadcast by Star Plus

References

External links

 Yeh Rishta Kya Kehlata Hai on Disney+ Hotstar
 

Hindi-language television shows
Indian drama television series
Indian television soap operas
2009 Indian television series debuts
Television shows set in Rajasthan
StarPlus original programming
id:Yeh Rishta Kya Kehlata Hai